These Ghosts are Family is a historical fiction novel by Maisy Card, published March 3, 2020 by Simon & Schuster.

Reception 
These Ghosts are Family received several positive reviews. The New York Times Book Review called it a "rich, ambitious debut novel," and Kirkus Reviews said it was "an intriguing debut with an inventive spin on the generational family saga". Entertainment Weekly, Millions, and LitHub named it the most anticipated book of 2020, and Buzz Magazine named it the Top New Book of the New Decade. 

The book has received starred reviews from Booklist and Publishers Weekly, as well as the following accolades:

References 

American historical novels
2020 American novels
Novels set in New York (state)
Novels set in New York City
Novels set in Jamaica
English-language literature
Simon & Schuster books